Dumitru Popescu may refer to:
 Dumitru Popescu (footballer, born 1942) (1942–1997), Romanian footballer
 Dumitru Popescu (footballer, born 1994), Moldavian footballer
 Dumitru Radu Popescu (born 1935), Romanian writer and politician
 Dumitru Popescu-Colibași (1912–1993), handball coach